Thryptomene kochii is a shrub species in the family Myrtaceae that is endemic to Western Australia. It blooms between May and October producing pink-white flowers. This thryptomene is found on plains in the Wheatbelt and Goldfields-Esperance regions of Western Australia where it grows in sandy to loamy soils.

This species was first formally described in 1911 by Ernst Georg Pritzel in the journal Repertorium specierum novarum regni vegetabilis from specimens collected by Max Koch near Cowcowing in 1904. The specific epithet (kochii) honours the collector of the type specimens.

References

kochii
Endemic flora of Western Australia
Rosids of Western Australia
Plants described in 1911
Taxa named by Ernst Pritzel